Vinum may refer to:

Vinum volume manager - a logical volume manager, also called Software RAID
A Latin term meaning wine